Cheshire is a surname, derived from the English county of Cheshire. Notable people with the surname include:

 Drew Cheshire (born 1991), English rugby union player
 Edward Cheshire, British brewer and Mayor of Smethwick 1902–1903
 Elizabeth Cheshire (born 1967), American actress
 Fleming D. Cheshire (1849–1922), American businessman, interpreter, and diplomat
 Geoffrey Cheshire (1886–1978), British barrister, scholar, and writer
 Godfrey Cheshire (born 1951), American film critic, film writer, and director
 Harry Cheshire (1891–1968), American actor
 Ian Cheshire (engineer) (born 1936), Scottish petroleum engineer
 Ian Cheshire (businessman) (born 1959), British businessman
 Jenny Cheshire, British sociolinguist and professor
 John Cheshire (born 1942), British retired senior Royal Air Force commander
 John Cheshire (boxer) (born 1947), British boxer
 John Cheshire (rugby league) (born 1933), Welsh rugby league footballer 
 Joseph Blount Cheshire (1850–1932), American Episcopal bishop of North Carolina, US
 Leonard Cheshire (1917–1992), British World War II RAF pilot and philanthropist
 Lorraine Cheshire (born 1958), English actress
 Maxine Cheshire (born 1930), American newspaper reporter
 Oliver Cheshire (born 1988), English fashion model and writer
 Rowan Cheshire (born 1995), British freestyle skier
 Simon Cheshire (born 1964), British author of children's literature
 Stuart Cheshire, computer scientist and programmer at Apple

English toponymic surnames